Chernyliava – a village (selo) in Yavoriv Raion, Lviv Oblast, in the West Ukraine. It belongs to Yavoriv urban hromada, one of the hromadas of Ukraine. The population of the village is 1745 people and Local government is administered by Chernyliavska Village Council.

Geography 
The village is located in the western part of the Lviv region near on the border of the Republic of Poland.

History and religion 
1480 is considered to be founding date of the village. 
The Men's Monastery in the 12th and 13th centuries has been in the village Chernyliava.  And Chernyliava village name comes from the word "chernets".
Church of the Holy Apostles Peter and Paul of Parish of UAOC is acting today in the village.

References

External links 
 Львівська обл., Чернилява, Яворівський район 
 weather.in.ua, Chernyliava (Lviv region)

Literature 
 Історія міст і сіл УРСР : Львівська область, Яворівський район, Чернилява. – К. : ГРУРЕ, 1968 р. Page 930 
 Лаба В. Історія села Чернилява від найдавніших часів до 1939 р. – Льв.: 2000 р. – 36 с.  

Villages in Yavoriv Raion